The Taiwan vole (Microtus kikuchii, now Alexandromys kikuchii) is a species of rodent in the family Cricetidae, It is an endemic species of Taiwan. This species is herbivorous with a preference for the Yushan cane (Yushania niitakayamensis).

References

Microtus
Mammals of Taiwan
Endemic fauna of Taiwan
Mammals described in 1920
Taxa named by Nagamichi Kuroda
Taxonomy articles created by Polbot